Bougainville may refer to:

Places
 Autonomous Region of Bougainville, historically known as the North Solomons, 
 Bougainville Island, the main island of the Autonomous Region of Bougainville in Papua New Guinea
 Bougainville campaign, World War II
 Bougainville, Somme, a commune in Somme département, France
 Bougainville Strait, a strait which separates Choiseul Island (Solomon Islands) from Bougainville Island (Papua New Guinea)
 Cape Bougainville, East Falkland, Falkland Islands, Falklands (United Kingdom); a cape
 Isla Bougainville, the Spanish name for Lively Island in the Falkland Islands

People
 Louis-Antoine de Bougainville (1729–1811), French navigator, explorer and military commander
 Hyacinthe de Bougainville (1781–1846), French naval officer and son of Louis Antoine de Bougainville
 Jean-Pierre de Bougainville (1722-1763), French writer, member of the Académie française, brother to Louis Antoine de Bougainville

Ships
 French ship Bougainville, various French ships named in honour of Louis Antoine de Bougainville
 Bougainville-class aviso, a group of colonial avisos, or sloops, built for the French Navy during the 1930s
 USS Bougainville (CVE-100), later CVU-100, a United States Navy Casablanca-class escort aircraft carrier
 CMA CGM Bougainville, a motor vessel, container ship of the French company CMA CGM, flagged by France

Literature and film
 Bougainville – Our Island Our Fight, a documentary film directed by Wayne Coles-Janess
 Bougainville (novel), a 1981 novel by Dutch author F. Springer
 The Tetherballs of Bougainville, a 1998 novel by American author Mark Leyner

Other uses
 Comte de Bougainville (Count of Bougainville), a French title of nobility held by Louis Antoine de Bougainville
 Bougainville Park, Papeete, French Polynesia (France); a park in Papeete

See also

 
 
 Bougainvillea, a genus of flowering plants native to South America
 Bougainvillia, a genus of hydroids
 Bougainvilliidae, a familia of hydroids
 Bougainville Campaign, a World War II military campaign fought from 1943 to 1945 between the Allies and Japan on and around Bougainville Island
 Bougainville counterattack, a battle within the campaign during March 1944
 Bougainville Civil War, 1988–1998
 Bougainville People's Congress, a pro-independence organisation and later political party
 New Bougainville Party, founded 2005